This Way is the fourth studio album by American singer-songwriter Jewel, released on November 13, 2001, by Atlantic Records. Jewel was looking for a raw, live-sounding album, leading her to be involved in the album's production. The album spawned the singles "Standing Still" and "Break Me", as well as the title track, which was also featured on the soundtrack to the film Life or Something Like It. The final single, "Serve the Ego", was remixed by Hani Num and Mike Rizzo and topped the US Hot Dance Club Play chart. The album debuted at number nine on the US Billboard 200 with first-week sales of 140,000 units. The album was certified platinum by the Recording Industry Association of America (RIAA) on December 17, 2001, and as of June 2010, it had sold over 1.5 million copies in the United States. This Way reached number six in Australia and has since been certified platinum by the Australian Recording Industry Association (ARIA).

Track listing

Personnel

Musicians

Jewel – vocals (all tracks)
Dann Huff – electric guitar (all tracks)
Jerry McPherson – electric guitar (tracks 1,2,6,7,8,9,10)
John Willis – acoustic guitar (tracks 1,4,6,8,10)
B. James Lowry – acoustic guitar (tracks 2,3,5,7,9,12)
Jimmie Lee Sloas – bass guitar (tracks 1,2,3,5,7,8,9,10,12)
Tim Akers – keyboard (all tracks except 11)
Chris McHugh – drums (tracks 1,3,8,9,11)
Steve Brewster – drums (tracks 2,4,5,6,7,10,12)
Eric Darken – percussion (tracks 1,2,6,7,8,10,11,12)
Kenny Greenberg – electric guitar (tracks 2,5,11)
Gordon Kennedy – electric guitar (tracks 5,11,12)
J. T. Corenflos – electric guitar (track 3)
Paul Franklin – steel guitar (track 6)
Dan Dugmore – steel guitar (track 9)
Jackie Street – bass guitar (tracks 4,6)
Craig Young – bass guitar (track 11)
Steve Nathan – keyboard (tracks 2,7,9,11)
Jonathan Yudkin – fiddle (track 6), mandolin (track 12), cello (track 12)
George Tidwell – trumpet (track 10)
Gene Miller – background vocals (tracks 3,6)
Bekka Bramlett – background vocals (track 3)
Chris Rodriguez – background vocals (track 3)
Lisa Cochran – background vocals (track 6)
Ronn Huff – string arrangements (tracks 4,10), string conductor (tracks 4,10)
Carl Gorodetzky – strings, string contractor (tracks 4,10)
Dave Angell – strings (track 4,10)
Monisa Angell – strings (track 4,10)
Janet Askey – strings (track 4,10)
Beth Beeson – strings (track 4,10)
Lynn Bloom – strings (track 4,10)
Bruce Christensen – strings (tracks 4,10)
Connie Ellisor – strings (tracks 4,10)
Gerald Greer – strings (tracks 4,10)
Anthony LaMarchina – strings (tracks 4,10)
Lee Larrison – strings (tracks 4,10)
Bob Mason – strings (tracks 4,10)
Cate Myer – strings (tracks 4,10)
Kathryn Plummer – strings (tracks 4,10)
Pamela Sixfin – strings (tracks 4,10)
Calvin Smith – strings (tracks 4,10)
Roger Spencer – strings (tracks 4,10)
Julie Tanner – strings (tracks 4,10) 
Alan Umstead – strings (track 4,10)
Catherine Umstead – strings (tracks 4,10)
Gary Vanosdale – strings (tracks 4,10)
Mary Kathryn Vanosdale – strings (tracks 4,10)
Glenn Wanner – strings (tracks 4,10)
Karen Winkelmann – strings (tracks 4,10)
Joy Worland – strings (tracks 4,10)
Mark Goldenberg – additional arrangement (track 2)
Tedd T. – programming (tracks 1,8)
David Huff – programming (track 8)
Wayne Rodriguez – drum programming (track 12)

Production
Producers: Jewel, Dann Huff, John Kurzweg
Executive producers: Lenedra Carroll, Ron Shapiro
Engineers: Jeff Balding, John Kurzweg
Assistant engineers: David Bryant, Jed Hackett
Mixing: Jeff Balding
Mastering: Robert Hadley, Doug Sax
Production coordination: Mike "Frog" Griffith
Art direction: Chad Farmer
Photography: Ellen Von Unwerth
Studio intern: Fred Hyser

Charts

Weekly charts

Year-end charts

Certifications

References

2001 albums
Albums produced by Dann Huff
Atlantic Records albums
Jewel (singer) albums